Applied Geography is a peer-reviewed scientific journal published quarterly by Elsevier. The journal covers research that applies geographic methods to solve human problems, including human geography, physical geography, and geographical information system science. The co-editors-in-chief are Nancy Hoalst-Pullen and Mark Patterson (Kennesaw State University).

Abstracting and indexing 
The journal is abstracted and indexed in:

According to the Journal Citation Reports, the journal has a 2020 impact factor of 4.240.

References

External links 
 

Elsevier academic journals
English-language journals
Geography journals
Publications established in 1981